Emir Rodríguez Monegal (28 July 1921 – 14 November 1985), born in Uruguay, was a scholar, literary critic, and editor of Latin American literature. From 1969 to 1985, Rodríguez Monegal was professor of Latin American contemporary literature at Yale University. He is usually called by his second surname Emir R. Monegal or Monegal (or erroneously Emir Rodríguez-Monegal).

Described as "one of the most influential Latin American literary critics of the 20th century" by the Encyclopædia Britannica, Monegal wrote key books about Pablo Neruda and Jorge Luis Borges, and the Britannica Macropædia notice of the later. He was a part in "The Boom" of 1960s Latin American literature as founder and 1966–1968 editor of his influential magazine Mundo Nuevo. Umberto Eco was quoted in saying that Jorge Luis Borges had read almost everything but no one knew that indiscernable totallity better than Emir.

He is remembered as a member of the Generation of 45, a Uruguayan intellectual and literary movement: Carlos Maggi, Manuel Flores Mora, Ángel Rama, Idea Vilariño, Carlos Real de Azúa, Carlos Martínez Moreno, Mario Arregui, Mauricio Muller, José Pedro Díaz, Amanda Berenguer, Tola Invernizzi, Mario Benedetti, Ida Vitale, Líber Falco, Juan Cunha, Juan Carlos Onetti, among others.

Biography

Early career (1921–1965)
In 1921, Emir Rodríguez Monegal was born on 28 July in Melo, Cerro Largo, Uruguay. He had the double-barrelled name Rodríguez Monegal (erroneously "Rodríguez-Monegal" in some texts) but was often referred to as R. Monegal or Monegal only, a Spanish naming custom when the first surname is extremely common.

From 1945 to 1957 (age 24 to 36), he edited the literary section of the Montevideo weekly Marcha. He was one of the first to recognize early on the importance of Borges, seeing him and his family frequently after 1945, and taking him for model to the point of pastiche. Conversely, he got a cameo in a pseudo-autobiographical Borges short story:

In 1949 (age 28), he won a scholarship from the British Council for a year's study at the University of Cambridge; he went to study under F. R. Leavis and complete a project on Andrés Bello. During 1949 to 1955 (age 28 to 34), he was also editor of Número, a Montevideo literary magazine. In 1952, he became friend with Pablo Neruda, who would later lend him his intimate papers for Monegal's biography of Neruda.

Mundo Nuevo (1966–1968)

In 1966 (age 45), Monegal directed the literary monthly Mundo Nuevo, published in Spanish in Paris.  Monegal directed it until July 1968, after the New York Times uncovered CIA connections with the Congress for Cultural Freedom, the Cold War mega-organization under which auspicies Mundo Nuevo was born.  Mundo Nuevo contributed to the 1960s publishing phenomenon dubbed "The Boom" in Latin American literature that led to many Latin American writers being published outside of their home countries and gaining critical recognition.

Yale University (1969–1985)
In 1969 (age 48), Monegal was appointed professor of Latin American contemporary literature at Yale University. From 1970 to 1973 (age 49 to 52), he was chairman of the Latin American Studies program and associate chairman of the Department of Romance Languages. From 1973 to 1976 (age 49 to 55), he was chairman of the Spanish and Portuguese Department.

From 1969 to 1977 (age 48 to 56), he was a member of the editorial board of Revista Iberoamericana (University of Pittsburgh) and from 1972 to 1977 (age 51 to 56) he was consulting editor of Review, a tri-quarterly published by the Center for Inter-American Relations in New York.

Also, from 1975 to 1982 (age 54 to 61), he was a visiting lecturer in seven universities in Brazil, and a visiting professor at the University of Southern California and the University of Pittsburgh.

In 1985 (aged 64), Monegal died on Thursday 14 November at Yale's infirmary in New Haven, Connecticut, USA. He was survived by his wife: Selma Calasans Rodrigues de Rodríguez; and three children: Georgina Rodríguez Nebot, Joaquín Rodríguez Nebot, and Alejandro Rodríguez Gerona.

Legacy
 His 1966–1968 work with Mundo Nuevo, as well as his books and lectures, was influential for the spread of Latin American literature, launching the career of such as Guillermo Cabrera Infante, Severo Sarduy, and Manuel Puig, and contributing to the internationalization of writers such as Gabriel García Márquez, Carlos Fuentes, and Mario Vargas Llosa.
 His April 1968 article  (reused in a chapter of his 1970 Borgès) introduced the concept of "Biorges". According to him, when Adolfo Bioy Casares and Jorge Luis Borges collaborated under the pseudonyms H. Bustos Domecq or B. Suárez Lynch, the results seemed written by a new personality, more than the sum of its parts, which he dubbed "Biorges" and considered in his own right as "one of the most important Argentine prose writers of his time", for having influenced writers such as Leopoldo Marechal (an otherwise anti-Borgesian), or Julio Cortázar's use of fictional language and slang in his masterpiece Hopscotch.

 His 1966 biography of his friend Pablo Neruda, who accepted to lend him his personal papers, remains a key book on the topic. Similarly, his 1970 study and 1978 biography of his friend Borges remain key books.
 In June 1985, Monegal published an article exploring the "kinship" between Derrida's themes in "Plato's Pharmacy" and the work of Borges, from essays and tales Derrida had read such as "Pierre Menard" (1939) and "Tlön" (1940). He wrote that "I had experienced [deconstruction] in Borges avant la lettre, though also writing that "the intent here is not to produce another exercise of the 'Borges, presursor of Derrida' variety."

Bibliography
The bulk of Monegal's works exists only in Spanish. For untranslated texts, an English equivalent of the title is provided in parentheses.

Books
 1950:  ("José Enrique Rodó in the twentieth century")
 1956:  ("The trial of the parricides. The new Argentine generation and their masters.", study of the dismissal of Borges, Mallea, and Martínez Estrada in Argentina)
 1961:  ("The roots of Horacio Quiroga")
 1961:  ("Storytellers of this America", seventeen essays on prominent fiction writers of contemporary Latin American literature)
 Expanded to thirty-four writers in two volumes (1969 and 1974)
 1963:  ("Eduardo Acevedo Díaz. Two versions of a same theme.")
 1964:  (with Homero Alsina Thevenet, "Ingmar Bergman. A cinematographic playwright.")
 1966:  ("The immobile traveler: an introduction to Pablo Neruda")
  (1973, French)
 1967:  ("Genius and character of Horacio Quiroga")
 1968:  ("The exile: life and work of Horacio Quiroga")
 1969:  ("The other Andrés Bello")
 1970:  (French, "Borges by himself")
  (1979, Spanish)
  (1987, Greek)
  (1980, Portuguese)
 1978: Jorge Luis Borges: A Literary Biography
  (1982, Italian)
  (1983, French)
  (1985, Spanish)

Articles
Selected among more than 330 articles and notices:

 1955: , in: Número 27
 Expanded, in:  (1969)
 1968: , in: Mundo Nuevo 22
 1972: , in: TriQuarterly 25
 1974: "Borges, Jorge Luis", in: Encyclopædia Britannica, Macropædia Vol. 3
 1974: "Borges, a Reader", in: diacritics 4
 1975: , in: Yates, A. Donald, ed. (1975) 
 1976: , in: Revista Iberoamericana 42
 1985: , in: Maldoror 21
 "Borges and Derrida. Apothecaries", in: Aizenberg, Edna, ed. (1990). Borges and His Successors. The Borgian Impact on Literature and the Arts.

Edited
 1950:  ("Uruguayan literature of the twentieth century", compilation of essays and documents)
 1957:  ("José Enrique Rodó: complete works")
 1963:  ("José Enrique Rodó: pages", anthology)
 1966:  ("The Uruguyan tale", short-story anthology)
 1966:  ("Juan Carlos Onetti: the faces of love", erotic texts anthology)
 1968:  ("The art of narration", interviews with leading Hispanic prose fiction writers)
 1970:  ("Juan Carlos Onetti. Complete novels and tales", anthology)
 1977: The Borzoi Anthology of Latin American Literature, 2 volumes (with Thomas Colchie)
 1979:  ("Hispanic masters of the 20th century", with Suzanne Jill Levine)
 1980:  (collection of critical essays on Pablo Neruda)
 1981: Borges: A Reader (anthology, with Alastair Reid)
  (1984, Spanish)

See also
 List of Uruguayan writers
 List of contemporary writers from northern Uruguay

References
 Primary sources consulted 

  (Archivo de Prensa doesn't mention the original publication. Additional date and magazine retrieved at from JSTOR via Google Scholar.)
 
 
 
 
 

 Tertiary sources consulted 

 
 
 

 Endnotes

External links

 Official sites

   – the Emir Rodríguez Monegal website (a few documents in English): biography, bibliography, interviews, article collection, etc.

 Online works
 "A Game of Shifting mirrors: the New Latin American Narrative and the North American Novel" (1973)
 "Borges, Jorge Luis" (1974, in: Britannica Macropædia)
 "The Metamorphoses of Caliban" (1977)
   (blue links lead to copies of articles)

 About Monegal
  (10 pictures, 1948–1984, with Borges, Paz, Vargas Llosa, Fuentes, Neruda, etc.)
 Voice of Monegal:  (MP3, 24:50, 24 MB)
    by Lisa Block de Behar
 Emir Rodriguez Monegal Papers (MS 1750). Manuscripts and Archives, Yale University Library.

                   

1921 births
1985 deaths
People from Melo, Uruguay
Uruguayan people of Spanish descent
Latin Americanists
Literary critics of Spanish
Uruguayan academics
Uruguayan expatriates in the United States
Uruguayan male writers
Uruguayan literary critics
Uruguayan essayists
Yale University faculty
20th-century essayists